ITFA may refer to:

 Internet Tax Freedom Act, a United States federal law
 International Tamil Film Awards